Egidio Romualdo Duni (or Egide Romuald Duny; 11 February 1708 – 11 June 1775) was an Italian composer who studied in Naples and worked in Italy, France and London, writing both Italian and French operas.

Biography

Born in Matera, Duni was taught music by his father, Francesco Duni, and two sisters. At the age of nine, he was accepted at the Conservatorio di Santa Maria di Loreto, near Naples. There he worked with Giovanni Battista Pergolesi, Giovanni Paisiello, and other masters of Italian opera.

His first success was with the opera Nerone presented at the Rome Carnival in 1735. Thereafter he was in London (Demofoonte, 1737), returning to Italy where he eventually became maestro di cappella in Parma in 1749.

The latter part of his career was spent in France where he played a key role in the development of the comédie mêlée d'ariettes (an early form of opéra comique), with such works as Le peintre amoureux de son modèle (Paris, 1757), La fée Urgèle (Fontainebleau, 1765), and L'école de la jeunesse (Paris, 1765).

He died in Paris.

Works

Italian operas
Nerone (Rome, 1735) 
Adriano in Siria on a libretto by Metastasio (1735–1736)
Giuseppe riconosciuto (1736)
La tirannide debellata (1736)
Demofoonte (London, 1737)
Didone abbandonata (1739)
Catone in Utica on a libretto by Metastasio (1740)
Bajazet (1743)
Artaserse (1744)
Ipermestra (1748)
Ciro riconosciuto (1748)
L'Olimpiade (Parma, 1755)
La buona figliuola (Parma, 1756)
Alessandro nelle Indie on a libretto
Adriano
Demetrio

French operas
Ninette à la cour, Parma (1755)
La chercheuse d'esprit, Paris (1756)
Le peintre amoureux de son modèle, Paris (1757)
Le docteur Sangrado, Saint Germain (1758)
La fille mal gardée, Paris (1758)
La veuve indécise, Paris (1759)
L’isle de foux, Paris (1760)
Nina et Lindor (1761)
Mazet, Paris (1761)
La bonne fille, Paris (1762)
Le retour au village, Paris (1762)
La plaidreuse et le procés, Paris (1763)
Le milicien, Versailles (1763)
Les deux chasseurs et la laitière (1763)
Le rendez-vous, Paris (1763)
L'école de la jeunesse, Paris (1765)
La fée Urgèle, Fontainebleau (1765)
La clochette, Paris (1766)
Les moissonneurs, Paris (1768)
Les sabots, Paris (1768)
Themire, Fontainebleau (1770)

References
Warrack, John and West, Ewan (1992), The Oxford Dictionary of Opera, 782 pages,

Notes

External links

Festival Duni 
Haendel.it biography 
Sassi Web biography 

1708 births
1775 deaths
People from Matera
Italian male classical composers
Italian Baroque composers
Italian Classical-period composers
Italian opera composers
Male opera composers
18th-century Italian composers
18th-century Italian male musicians